Route or routes may refer to:
 Route (gridiron football), a path run by a wide receiver
 Route (command), a program used to configure the routing table
 Route, County Antrim, an area in Northern Ireland
 The Route, a 2013 Ugandan film
 Routes, Seine-Maritime, a commune in Seine-Maritime, France
 Routes (video game), 2003 video game

See also 
 Acronyms and abbreviations in avionics
 Air route or airway
 GPS route, a series of one or more GPS waypoints
 Path (disambiguation)
 Rout, a disorderly retreat of military units from the field of battle
 Route number or road number
 Router (disambiguation)
 Router (woodworking)
 Routing (disambiguation)
 Routing table
 Scenic route, a thoroughfare designated as scenic based on the scenery through which it passes
 Trade route, a commonly used path for the passage of goods